Deoki Nandan Jatia (1930 – 12 November 2000) was an Indian philatelist who was added to the Roll of Distinguished Philatelists in 1983.

References

Signatories to the Roll of Distinguished Philatelists
1930 births
2000 deaths
Indian philatelists